John Lee Paul Jr. (February 19, 1960 – December 29, 2020) was an American racing driver. He competed in CART and the Indy Racing League competitions, but primarily in IMSA GT Championship, winning the title in 1982.

During his career, Paul was a twice winner of the 24 Hours of Daytona, the first of these was while co-driving with his father, John Paul Sr. A few weeks later, the pair won the 1982 12 Hours of Sebring. Paul also triumphed in another major U.S. race, the 1983 CART's Michigan 500.

Beside racing with his father, Paul also joined his father in criminal activities, in particular a drug smuggling operation.  In May 1986, Paul Jr. received a five-year sentence for racketeering, with the drug charges dropped. Paul Sr. was found guilty, and served time, for a number of crimes over the years.

Career

Beginnings
After graduating from high school, Paul Jr. started working for his father's team, JLP Racing, learning the ins and outs of what a racing organization was. He became some kind of jack-of-all-trades within the team. As Paul Jr. started to learn about engines, his father decided his son needed to go to a racing school. He was enrolled at the Skip Barber Racing School, but Paul Jr. was deemed to be hopeless.  Despite this setback, Paul Sr. bought his son a new Van Diemen Formula Ford. In 1979, he took part in SCCA National Formula Ford races, and made the SCCA National Championship Runoffs.

1980s 
Paul Jr.'s career really launched in 1980, when he became part of JLP Racing's driver line-up. His first race was at Coca-Cola 400 at Lime Rock. Co-driving alongside his father in a Porsche 935, they won the second heat, and subsequently the race overall. Junior had won the first IMSA race he entered. He repeated this feat by winning the Road America Pabst 500 three months later. With three second places, he would finish fourth in the final IMSA GTP standings.

During the 1981 season the Porsche team faced a new challenge from the Lola T600. The Chevrolet-powered prototype with its better handling, driven by Englishman Brian Redman, quickly dominated the IMSA Championship. During the season, it became clear that only Junior could challenge for race victories, so Senior became JLP Racing's team manager, while Junior did the driving. Senior then only co-drove in the endurance races. Despite having the Lola, the Pauls won a rain-shortened race at Pocono in their Porsche 935 JLP-3. Using the same 935, Junior would go on to win the Daytona finale.

The Pauls started the 1982 season with back-to-back wins in the US classic endurance races, the 24 Hours of Daytona and the 12 Hours of Sebring. For the Daytona race, they were partnered by the 1977 Deutsche Rennsport Meisterschaft Champion, Rolf Stommelen. At Sebring, they overcame a gearbox failure in their 935 to win over the March 82G, led by the hard charging Bobby Rahal. The Pauls' second team car was also on the podium.  More importantly, Paul Jr.'s win at Road Atlanta attracted Miller Brewing Company sponsorship for the remainder of the season.  He then switched to the Lola to win at Laguna Seca. He teamed up again with his father in the 935 JLP-3 to win the Charlotte 500 km.

Outpowered by championship rival, John Fitzpatrick in Porsche 935K4, Paul Jr. drove a new Porsche 935 JLP-4 to a debut victory at Brainerd.  He scored another win at Portland, before swapping back to the older Porsche for the endurance races. He drove the JLP-3 with his father to win the Mosport 6 Hours. For the next endurance race, Paul was partnered with Mauricio de Narváez, and the pair finished second in Road America, behind the English pairing of Fitzpatrick and David Hobbs. He was re-united with his father at Road Atlanta for the 500 km event. Their last race together resulted in a second place in Pocono. Paul Jr. had clinched the IMSA GT Championship at the age of 22, becoming IMSA's youngest ever GTP champion.

At the beginning of 1983 Paul Sr. shot federal witness Stephen Caron, who would testify about Paul's illegal activities. After finishing second in the Grand Prix of Miami in a JLP Racing Lola, the team would be dismantled following his father's disappearance. Paul Jr. was hired by Henn's Swap Shop Racing for both the 12 Hours of Sebring and the Road America Pabst 500 but these resulted in two DNFs.

Away from IMSA, he tried his hand at CART racing, winning the 1983 Norton Michigan 500 in only his fourth Indycar start. After leading 66 of the 250 laps aboard the VDS Associates's Penske PC10, he passed Rick Mears on the last lap and took the checkered flag seconds later as Mears spun and crashed behind him. With a second place in the Caesars Palace Grand Prix (Las Vegas) and a further two third places, he would go on to finish 8th in points in 1983. Meanwhile, another new series, another victory first time out. This time in the Trans-Am series, he won for DeAtley Motorsports at Trois-Rivières.

In 1984, Paul finished second in the 1984 24 Hours of Le Mans with Jean Rondeau in a Preston Henn's T-Bird Swap Shop Porsche 956. He also finished second in the Six Hours of Watkins Glen, this time driving with Bruce Leven in his Bayside Disposal Racing Porsche 962. After this race, he was offered a seat alongside John Morton, by Conte Racing. Apart from an 8th place in Road America, Paul and Morton did not finish any races aboard the March-Chevrolet 84G.  The CART scene did not fare much better. Although he entered nine of the sixteen races, this was for four different teams. The best result was a third-place in the Caesars Palace Grand Prix, for Provimi Veal Racing, in their March-Cosworth 84C.

Paul Sr. was finally indicted, tried, and convicted, in 1985. Paul Jr. started the season with Conte Racing, who had switched to Buick engines, but these proved to be unreliable. In total, he had 11 DNFs in 11 IMSA starts. After wrecking his AMI Racing March-Cosworth 85C in Indianapolis 500, he would finish only one race, the Budweiser Cleveland Grand Prix in 17th.

Early in 1986, Paul Jr. broke his string of seventeen IMSA DNFs by finishing second at Road Atlanta alongside Whitney Ganz for RC Buick Hawk, in their March-Buick 85G.

1990s
Following his release from prison in October 1988, Paul Jr. returned to racing in 1989. In CART, he only drove in the Indianapolis 500 from 1990 to 1994, but he made his comeback in IMSA. His first season back he drove in six races for five teams. The best result was a fourth place in the Grand Prix of San Antonio for Momo/Gebhardt Racing.

A full-time return to sportscar racing was possible in 1990, when he was offered a ride by Jim Busby, who had entered a Nissan GTP ZX-Turbo. In only his second race for the team, Paul and Kevin Cogan were on the podium after taking second place in the Grand Prix of Miami. Following a fifth place in Sebring, the Nissan was maintained by Seabrooke Racing. He ended the season with two second places in the World Challenge of Tampa and Grand Prix of Greater San Diego (Del Mar). His reward was 8th in the overall standings, but as he found, a lot of things had changed in these four seasons he missed. Full factory supported teams like Tom Walkinshaw Racing (Jaguar), Electramotive (Nissan) and All American Racers (Toyota) were now the ones to beat.

In 1991 Paul ran a short IMSA schedule, taking in just seven races. Although the bulk of these were with Gunnar Racing in their Gunnar 966, it was in Hotchkiss Racing's underpowered Spice-Pontiac SE90P that he earned a second place in the Grand Prix of Greater San Diego. Paul Jr. also drove two NASCAR Winston Cup Series races, in a Chevrolet for Team Ireland both in 1991, recording a best result of 16th in the Budweiser at The Glen.

During the 1992 season, Paul experienced his first ever GTU class win in Leitzinger Racing's Nissan 240SX, which he shared with Butch Leitzinger and David Loring, the 12 Hours of Sebring. He accepted an offer from Giampiero Moretti to race at Watkins Glen, where the pair finished 6th in a Joest Racing Porsche 962. Another outing for Hotchkiss Racing resulted in 8th in Laguna Seca in their Spice-Pontiac. This was followed by three more races with Moretti, but Paul ended the season by trying yet another car, the Intrepid RM-1, but this resulted in another DNF.

The 1993 season started with Paul co-driving with Moretti along with Derek Bell at the Daytona and Sebring endurance races in a Nissan NPT-90. The trio were joined by Massimo Sigala for Daytona, and were leading when the car began to experience engine problems, but it still finished sixth. Sebring proved kinder to them, as they finished second. Paul then switched to Gunnar Racing for a few races. He was able to take one last podium finish, a second-place at Road American, driving a Porsche 962 for Joest Racing.

1994 saw IMSA become the World Sports Cars Championship [WSC] and Paul only raced twice in the new series. He joined Dyson Racing for the inaugural race, the Rolex 24 at Daytona. An oil pump problem with their Spice DR-3 saw another DNF for Paul and company. He was asked back to partner James Weaver at the Indy Grand Prix, a two-hour race around the Indianapolis Raceway Park. They finished second.

For 1995, Paul would race for Dyson Racing in the WSC and for the Prototype Technology Group (BMW M3) in the IMSA GTS, as many races were at the same event.  He recorded two top three finishes for Dyson aboard their Riley & Scott Mk III: second place with Butch Leitzinger in the Moosehead Grand Prix, and a third place with Andy Wallace in the Texas World Grand Prix.

He continued with Dyson Racing into 1996. Paul recorded four top three finishes in the last four races, including wins at the Mosport 500 and the Daytona IMSA finale, while co-driving with Leitzinger. He finished the season sixth in the overall standings.  1996 also saw the formation of the Indy Racing League, and this gave Paul a second shot at a competitive Indycar career. Despite driving a two-year-old car for a new team, PDM Racing, he led 22 laps in that year's Las Vegas 500 before finishing 15th.

In 1997, he competed with a contemporary IndyCar for the first time since 1985, and promptly finished 15th in the points. He also competed in the WSC with Dyson Racing. He continued where he left off in 1996 by winning at Daytona. His victory in the Rolex 24 at Daytona came as part of seven driver crew. This was followed by two victories, partnering Leitzinger in the Sportscar Grand Prix and VISA Sports Car Championship.

Paul Jr. started the 1998 season with PDM Racing and Team Pelfrey before landing a competitive ride with Byrd-Cunningham Racing. He broke through to win the 1998 Lone Star 500 at Texas Motor Speedway and finished an IRL career best 11th in points.

In his seven Indy 500 starts he had a best finish of seventh in 1998. He made his last IRL start the following season.

2000s 
The new millennium saw Paul return to his roots, sports car racing. He teamed up with Dyson Racing once again, and recorded four top three finishes, the best being a second  in the U.S. Road Racing Classic, a 250-mile race at Mid-Ohio.

Drug trafficking
Paul was lured into the drug trade at the age of 15, just to be with his father. His first legal troubles were on January 10, 1979, when he and another accomplice were caught by customs agents loading equipment onto a pickup truck on the bank of a canal in the Louisiana bayous after dark. Following questioning, when one of them smelled cannabis on their clothing, his father was apprehended on his 42-foot boat named Lady Royale, where customs discovered residue of marijuana and $10,000 onboard. A rented truck was discovered nearby, which contained 1,565 pounds (710 kg) of marijuana. In court, all three pleaded guilty to marijuana possession charges, where each was placed on three years' probation and fined $32,500.

Paul's racing career was interrupted in May 1986, when he was sentenced to five years in prison for his involvement in a drug trafficking ring with his father and subsequent refusal to testify against him. He was sent to a minimum-security prison in Alabama. He served a total of 30 months, being released in October 1988.

Retirement and death
Paul Jr. retired from professional racing in 2001 after noticing that the telemetry of the Corvette GT-1 he was testing did not match what he thought his feet were doing in the car. A subsequent medical evaluation confirmed he had Huntington's disease, a progressive neurological disorder.

In 2018, author and racing journalist Sylvia Wilkinson published a book about Paul Jr., titled 50/50, The Story of Champion Race Car Driver John Paul Jr. and his Battle with Huntington's Disease.

Paul Jr. died on December 29, 2020, in Woodland Hills, California.

Racing record

Career highlights

American Open Wheel racing results

(key) (Races in bold indicate pole position)

CART

IndyCar

NASCAR
(key) (Bold – Pole position awarded by qualifying time. Italics – Pole position earned by points standings or practice time. * – Most laps led.)

Winston Cup Series

Indianapolis 500 results

Complete 24 Hours of Le Mans results

Complete 24 Hours of Daytona results

Complete 12 Hours of Sebring results

References

1960 births
2020 deaths
12 Hours of Sebring drivers
24 Hours of Le Mans drivers
24 Hours of Daytona drivers
American Le Mans Series drivers
American people of Dutch descent
Atlantic Championship drivers
Champ Car drivers
Neurological disease deaths in California
Deaths from Huntington's disease
IMSA GT Championship drivers
Indianapolis 500 drivers
IndyCar Series drivers
NASCAR drivers
People convicted of racketeering
Racing drivers from Indiana
SCCA National Championship Runoffs participants
Sportspeople from Muncie, Indiana
Trans-Am Series drivers
World Sportscar Championship drivers
PDM Racing drivers
Team Joest drivers
Corvette Racing drivers
Team Pelfrey drivers
Bettenhausen Racing drivers
AFS Racing drivers
Dale Coyne Racing drivers